Nathan John Edward Woodthorpe (born 6 December 2001) is an English professional footballer who plays as a defender for Lancaster City.He is the son of former footballer Colin Woodthorpe.

Career
A graduate of Crewe Alexandra's Academy, he signed a professional contract in 2020.

In August 2021, Woodthorpe joined Witton Albion on an initial month-long loan, which was extended for a second month. He scored on his debut for the club in their 1-1 draw against Gainsborough Trinity.

Upon returning to Crewe, he made his Crewe debut on 9 November 2021 in an EFL Trophy group game against Wolves Under-21s at Gresty Road, but after his second appearance, against Doncaster Rovers on 1 December 2021 in the same competition, suffered an ankle injury. Following relegation to League Two, Woodthorpe was released by Crewe at the end of the 2021–22 season.

On 3 February 2023, Woodthorpe signed forNorthern Premier League side Lancaster City.

Career statistics

References

Living people
English footballers
Association football defenders
Crewe Alexandra F.C. players
Witton Albion F.C. players
Northern Premier League players
2001 births